Music Festivals have a long history in Melbourne, Australia. One of the oldest and most famous music festival held in Australia was the Sunbury Music Festival. The Sunbury Music Festival was held from 1972 - 1975 often regarded as a milestone in Australian music for many reasons. Although it wasn't the first major music festival that Australia saw, it was the first successful music event which actually turned a profit, enough for it to run consecutively for four years. Since then Melbourne has seen a secession of great festivals. Today Melbourne is a favourite location for artists and festival goers alike.

Festivals
Stereosonic
Big Day Out
Creamfields
Summadayze
Sensation
Solar Music Festival
Future Music Festival
Trick or Beat
Blueprint Music Festival

External links
 Melbourne Music Festival News

Music festivals in Melbourne